Honey Creek Railroad  was a short-line railroad in Rush County, Indiana.  The line begins at its interchange with CSX on the west side of Rushville and stretches north approximately six miles, ending at the town of Sexton.  Honey Creek's operations began October 1, 1993 and consist almost exclusively of hauling grain. In 2017, CSX took over the entire line.

External links
Bureau of Transportation Statistics: Freight Railroads Operating in Indiana by Class (2000)
Indiana Department of Transportation Railroad Map (2005)
US Railroad Retirement Board Determination: Honey Creek Railroad

Indiana railroads
Transportation in Rush County, Indiana
Railway companies established in 1993
Spin-offs of Conrail